The 1949 South American Basketball Championship was the 14th edition of this regional tournament.  It was held in Asunción, Paraguay and won by the Uruguay national basketball team.  6 teams competed.

Final rankings

Results

Each team played the other five teams once, for a total of five games played by each team and 15 overall in the preliminary round. Ties in the standings were broken by head-to-head results, as only a tie for first would have resulted in a final match.

External links

FIBA.com archive for SAC1949

1949
S
International basketball competitions hosted by Paraguay
Champ
Sports competitions in Asunción
1940s in Asunción
April 1949 sports events in South America
May 1949 sports events in South America
Bask